Sheldon Dion Brown (born March 19, 1979) is a former American football cornerback in the National Football League (NFL). He was drafted by the Philadelphia Eagles in the second round of the 2002 NFL Draft and also played for the Cleveland Browns. He played college football at South Carolina.

Early years
Brown grew up in Fort Lawn, SC and attended Lewisville High School in Richburg, South Carolina, where he not only starred on defense, but was also a highly touted running back.

College career
Brown played college football at the University of South Carolina.  While majoring in Sports and Entertainment Management, he was a four-year player and three-year starter.  A two-time All-SEC awardee in football, Brown also played baseball for South Carolina during his junior year.

Professional career

Philadelphia Eagles
Brown was a second round draft pick of the 2002 NFL Draft out of the University of South Carolina by the Philadelphia Eagles. Known for his hard hitting, he earned additional attention during 2006 NFC Divisional Playoff Game against the New Orleans Saints, when he prevented running back Reggie Bush from catching a pass, by delivering a massive, blind-sided hit, which he dislodged the pass and knocked Bush to the ground for some time.  This hit was chosen by a number of football analysts as the hit of the year, and Bush later called it the hardest hit he ever took.

Brown has returned six touchdowns in his career, from four interceptions and two fumbles. He had a 40-yard touchdown return from an interception during Week 4 against the Kansas City Chiefs of the 2005 season and an 80-yard touchdown return from a fumble during Week 5 against the Dallas Cowboys of the 2005 season. Brown had a 70-yard touchdown return from an interception during Week 10 against the Washington Redskins of the 2006 season. Brown had an 83-yard touchdown return from an interception off of a pass from Chris Redman during Week 12 against the Atlanta Falcons of the 2009 season. Brown had a 60-yard fumble return for touchdown during Week 14 against the New York Giants of the 2009 season.

Cleveland Browns

On April 2, 2010, Brown and linebacker Chris Gocong were traded to the Cleveland Browns in exchange for 4th and 5th round draft picks in the 2010 NFL Draft as well as linebacker Alex Hall. His final career interception returned for a touchdown was in a 2012 game against the Cincinnati Bengals.

Personal
Brown resided in Marlton, New Jersey and Lake Wylie, South Carolina during his tenure with the Eagles.

In 2008, Brown was named the recipient of the Philadelphia Sports Writers Association "Good Guy" Award.

References

External links
 Official website
 University of South Carolina Gamecocks bio

1979 births
Living people
Players of American football from South Carolina
People from Evesham Township, New Jersey
People from Lancaster, South Carolina
Sportspeople from Burlington County, New Jersey
People from Chester, South Carolina
American football cornerbacks
South Carolina Gamecocks football players
Philadelphia Eagles players
Cleveland Browns players